The following tables compare technical information for a commercial PC Power Management software suites. Please see the individual products' articles for further information. The table only includes systems that are widely used and currently available.

References 

Computers and the environment
Software comparisons